Ishaara is a 1964 Indian film directed by K. Amarnath, starring Joy Mukherjee, Vyjayanthimala and Pran.

Plot
Sent to Boarding School at a very young age, Mala returns home to Delhi after 10 years to find that everything has changed. Her widowed mom has remarried wealthy Khemchand, and all of the family, which consists of a sister, Shashi; brother, Deep, and a younger brother, Munna, live in a palatial house. Khemchand does business illicitly as an insurance broker when the government decides to nationalize insurance companies, he is arrested and sentenced to 7 years in jail. His entire family is thrown out on the street, where they are taken care of by Vijay, a poor stage artist, who has fallen in love with Mala, who also has a place in her heart for him. But circumstances keep the two lovers apart, so much so that Mala is forced to refuse Vijay's help, re-locates further away from him, and joins a dance troupe.

Cast 
 Joy Mukherjee as Vijay
 Vyjayantimala as Mala
 Pran as Suresh Das
 Jayant as Khemchand
 Shammi as Muniya
 Subbiraj as Deep
 Murad as Dwarka Das
 Praveen Paul as Dwarka's wife
 Sajjan as Ramu
 Azra as Shashi
 Pratima Devi as Khemchand's wife
 Agha as Chuniya
 Harbans Darshan Arora as Police Inspector
 Birbal as a Man, Deep's fight with
 Paul Sharma as Suresh's goon
 Mridula Rani as Vijay's mother
 Ruby Mayor as Textile Emporium's customer 
 Kesari as Shashi K. Lalla
 Hari Shivdasani as Madan Rais
 Raja Amrohi as Munna

Music
All songs were written by Majrooh Sultanpuri.

"Hey Abdullah Nagin Wala Aa Gaya" - Lata Mangeshkar, Mohammed Rafi	
"Dil Bekarar Sa Hai" (male) - Mohammed Rafi
"Dil Bekarar Sa Hai" (female) - Lata Mangeshkar
"Chal Mere Dil Lahrake Chal" - Mukesh
"Chori Ho Gayi Raat Nayan Ki Nindiya" - Mahendra Kapoor, Lata Mangeshkar
"Tose Naina Laga Ke Mai Hai" - Lata Mangeshkar
"Nahin Jahaan Mein Nadan Koi" - Mahendra Kapoor, Lata Mangeshkar

References

External links

1964 films
1960s Hindi-language films